Esanatoglia is a town and comune in the Marche, Italy.

History

According to the legend, Esus, the Celtic God of war, would be the origin of the name of the Esino river, on whose shores  a town, Aesa, is presumed to have been founded in Roman times.

The current name Esanatoglia was given in 1862, from a combination between Aesa and Anatolia, replacing  the medieval Santa Anatolia, which in turn was derived from Saint Anatolia, a 3rd-century Christian martyr. The first known document referring to Santa Anatolia dates from 1015, concerning the foundation of the monastery of Sant’Angelo by Conte Atto and his wife Berta. The monastery became soon the most important religious establishment in the area.

The city was ruled by the Malcavalca until 1211, when they were succeeded the Ottoni di Matelica. Three years later, and for three hundred years, the da Varano family hold the city. Under the da Varano Santa Anatolia maintained a certain autonomy: the first collection of statutory norms dates from 1324. The citadel remained immune from wars and pillages until 1443, when it was conquered by Francesco I Sforza. The monastery of Sant'Angelo and its  library did not escape the devastation.

In 1502 it became part of the Papal States.

Main sights
Eremo di San Cataldo; formerly part of a hermitage, now a guard tower of medieval origin, located at  the top of the mountain facing the city.
Eremo di San Pietro di Esanatoglia; formerly a hermitage atop a steep mountain side.
San Martino: 13-14th-century church located in the city's center 
San Sebastiano
Santa Maria Maddalena: baroque church
Fountain of San Martino (possibly from the 12th century). In 1534 it was re-built by order of Cardinal Alessandro Farnese
Sant'Andrea Gate

People
Carlo Milanuzzi, composer of the early Baroque era

References

External links
Official website 
 BellAesa - La Bella Esanatoglia on the web 
Eremo San Cataldo 
Memorial for the Fallen of War 
 I Borghi piu Belli d'Italia 
 Corsi di parapaendio e voli in tandem sul Monte Gemmo, Esanatoglia 

Cities and towns in the Marche